Elections to Adur District Council were held on 4 May 2006. Half of the council was up for election and the Conservative Party held overall control of the council.

After the election, the composition of the council was:
Conservative 26
Independent 2
Liberal Democrat 1

Results

2 Conservatives were unopposed.

Ward results

References
BBC report of 2006 Adur election result

2006
2006 English local elections
2000s in West Sussex